Gilles Vidal (born ca. 1972) is a French car designer, appointed Director of Style by Peugeot at the start of 2010. He was responsible for the design direction of the 2010's at Peugeot. He is currently the design director at Renault, having joined the brand since 2020.

Biographical note 
Vidal received his diploma from the Art Center College of Design in Vevey (Switzerland) and joined Citroën in 1996.   Here he worked with Jean-Pierre Ploué and was responsible for the restyled Berlingo, the rally version of the Saxo and the “Osmose” (Osmosis) concept car.   In 2005 he assumed overall responsibility for Citroën's concept cars. 
 
After his boss at Citroën, Jean-Pierre Ploué, was promoted to a position of responsibility for styling of both the Citroën and Peugeot brands in 2009, Gilles Vidal assumed responsibility for concept cars in the Peugeot style, supervising the Peugeots BB1 and SR1.   He took a major part in defining the new identity for the Peugeot brand which would be unveiled at the beginning of 2010, and in January 2010 Ploué appointed him Peugeot Design Director.

Vidal is responsible for the current design direction at Peugeot and is responsible for the New 208, New 2008, 3008, 5008, 508 and 508 SW. His departure from Peugeot was announced in July 2020. He later joined Renault as their design director that same year.

References 

This article incorporates information from the equivalent entry in the French, Wikipedia.

Year of birth missing (living people)
Peugeot people
French automobile designers
Living people